A list of earliest films produced in Iran ordered by year of release before 1960. For an alphabetical list of Iranian films see :Category:Iranian films

1930s

1940s

1950s

External links
 Iranian film at the Internet Movie Database

1930s
Iranian
Films
Iranian
Films
Iranian
Films